The Ball of Fortune is a 1926 British silent sports film directed by Hugh Croise and starring Billy Meredith, James Knight and Mabel Poulton. Based on the 1925 novel of the same title by Sydney Horler, the film is set against the backdrop of professional football. Top player Billy Meredith appears as himself. It was produced by an Leeds-based independent film company and involved footage shot at the city's Elland Road Stadium. It is now considered a lost film.

Cast
 Billy Meredith as himself
 James Knight as Dick Huish
 Mabel Poulton as Mary Wayne
 Geoffrey B. Partridge as James Brighurst
 Dorothy Boyd as Connie
 Mark Barker as Bent
 John Longden as Daltry
 Charles Barratt as  Daniel Brighurst
 Patrick Aherne

References

Bibliography
 Glynn, Stephen. The British Football Film. Springer, 2018.

External links

1926 films
British association football films
British silent feature films
British sports drama films
British black-and-white films
1920s sports films
Films shot in Yorkshire
Films based on British novels
1920s English-language films
1920s British films
Silent drama films
Silent sports films